Emma Oosterwegel (born 29 June 1998) is a Dutch track and field athlete who specializes in heptathlon. She won a bronze medal at the 2020 Summer Olympics, competing in women's heptathlon. She was born in Deventer, and is a Soil, Water and Atmosphere student at Wageningen University

References

External links

Dutch heptathletes
1998 births
Living people
World Athletics Championships athletes for the Netherlands
Sportspeople from Deventer
Athletes (track and field) at the 2020 Summer Olympics
Olympic heptathletes
Medalists at the 2020 Summer Olympics
Olympic bronze medalists for the Netherlands
Olympic bronze medalists in athletics (track and field)
Olympic athletes of the Netherlands
21st-century Dutch women